is a Japanese manga written and illustrated by Robico about the relationship between a girl named Shizuku Mizutani and a boy named Haru Yoshida. It was serialized in Kodansha's Dessert magazine from August 23, 2008 to June 24, 2013. An anime adaptation by Brain's Base aired from October 2 to December 25, 2012. It was also streamed on Crunchyroll during its original run.

Plot
My Little Monster focuses on the relationship between Shizuku Mizutani, who has absolutely no interests except in studying and her plans for the future, and a boy named Haru Yoshida, who sits next to Shizuku in class but rarely attends school. After Shizuku is tasked with delivering class printouts to Haru's home, she meets Haru, who immediately greets her as a friend, starting their new relationship. Nicknamed "dry ice," Shizuku is renowned as a girl who is emotionless and cold. However, when she meets Haru she is touched by his innocence and his lack of knowledge concerning human relationships. Though known as a violent and uncontrollable monster, Haru is actually kind and gentle. Haru immediately declares his love towards Shizuku, but it takes much longer for Shizuku to realize and accept her own feelings towards Haru. Together, as two previously unsocial beings, they help each other learn how to care for each other and relate with their friends and family.

Characters

Main characters

 (drama CD), Haruka Tomatsu (anime)
Played by: Tao Tsuchiya
Shizuku is a high school girl who focuses all her time on academics so that she can have a future career with a 10 million yen annual income. She is considered cold by many for her no-nonsense and blunt attitude, and has no friends, but after encountering Haru, she starts expressing more of her emotions, standing up to situations that seem wrong like when Haru had been used by his alleged friends for money. Although she is bothered by Haru and his antics, some of which are romantic gestures towards her, she develops feelings for him. She is proud of being number one in her class, but after meeting Haru, whom she thought would be her academic rival, she no longer enjoys the thrill of topping that list. Her classmate Asako Natsume calls her  and becomes her first female friend. Although she styles her hair in pigtails and dresses rather plainly, preferring wool underwear and clothing that she gets from sales from retail stores, there are occasions where she has let her hair down, although Haru prefers the tails because he would be unable to find her.
 Throughout the story, Shizuku often questions why she is attracted to Haru and likes him so much. In the manga, she admits to Haru that she was jealous of his personality and that he will never understand her feelings. When Haru runs away, she blames herself for it. However, when he returns, he wants her to share to him her feelings. Haru tells her that he is going away for a year, so she is without him for her third year of high school. Nevertheless, she stills remains faithful to Haru and continues on with her life. She marries Haru after college, and there is a teaser at the end of the manga that shows her working at a legal agency.

 (drama CD), Tatsuhisa Suzuki (anime)
Played by: Masaki Suda
Haru, the title character, has a reputation of being a trouble maker, having been suspended from school for getting in a scuffle with schoolmates, and staying away from school even after the suspension was lifted. When he meets Shizuku, the first schoolmate to ever do something for him, he immediately considers her his first real friend and does many antics to be with her, following her around at school, and pulling her away from her routine life. He tells her that he likes her and might even be in love with her, which often flusters Shizuku. He has a spontaneous and carefree personality and often takes his frustrations out physically on other people. Academically, he is very smart, having entered high school as the top-ranked student but skipping out on the entrance ceremony, having studied most of the high school curriculum while he was sitting out most of middle school, and frequently topping the school's exam scores, much to Shizuku's frustration. He has a rooster named Nagoya, later bringing and housing it in school (with the reluctant approval from his teacher).
 He cares for Shizuku deeply, and gets jealous of Yamaken's interactions with Shizuku. Later on, he and Shizuku end up in different classes for their second-year of high school, but this does not change their romantic intimacy. He shuns his father's rich and famous family background, and went to live with his aunt Kyoko (Mitchan's mother) who had been cast out of the family. It was from Kyoko that he started learning how to find someone to love. When he attends his brother Yuzan's birthday party with the socialites, he and Shizuku have a falling out and he stops attending Shizuku's school. But he eventually comes back and reconciles with Shizuku. He then takes the entirety of the third year off to work with his aunt's research group and also as a deep sea fisherman. In the final chapters, after Shizuku has gone to college, he and Shizuku get married.

Supporting characters

 (drama CD), Tomoyuki Higuchi (anime)
Played by: Mokomichi Hayami
Haru's cousin, nicknamed , who runs a batting cage center. He looks after Haru since his place is near Haru's school. He often comforts and encourages Asako about her situations, but when Asako develops a crush on him, he turns down her confession because of their difference in age. Haru notes that Mitchan can be clueless about relationships sometimes as he once did not realize his girlfriend had dumped him until six months later. He is always wearing sunglasses; the one time he did not, he had scared Haru because his eyes resembled Haru's father's.

 (drama CD), Takuma Terashima (anime)
Played by: Yuki Yamada
 Haru's acquaintance, nicknamed  by his friends. He used to bother Haru for money until Shizuku stopped him, although it is later revealed that he comes from a wealthy family. He attends the same cram school as Shizuku, and gives her helpful advice on her relationship with Haru. However, over the course of the series, he is bothered that he is increasingly attracted to Shizuku and inadvertently competing against Haru for her affections. He eventually confesses to Shizuku, but is turned down, with Haru and Shizuku soon declaring they are a couple. Though Shizuku and Yamaken remain friends. Besides his constant denial that he has a romantic interest in Shizuku, Yamaken is the subject of recurring gags of having a poor sense of direction and also fleeing on sight from Yuzan because he was beaten by him whenever he tried to bully Haru. He first met Haru in elementary school where Haru would best him both in academics and in sports. He attends an all-boys high school and hangs out with three guys who openly fawn over Asako Natsume, call Shizuku "Nerd Queen", and also like Chizuru. The three guys are named in volume 3: Tomio (Tomioka) who has light spiky hair; Ma-Bo (Masahiro) who has dark somewhat spiky hair and wears a baseball cap; and George (Jojima) who has straight hair and wears glasses. They are later revealed to come from high society backgrounds like Yamaken.

 (drama CD), Atsumi Tanezaki (anime)
Played by: Elaiza Ikeda
Asako is Shizuku and Haru's classmate. Before meeting Shizuku and Haru, she did not have any friends except for some people from an online community. She initially asks Shizuku to help her study for a make-up exam and so she can attend a real-life meeting with that community; however, the meeting turns out to be a disappointment as only the guys wanted to talk with her, so she unsubscribes from it and joins a new online blog group. She treasures her friendship with "Mitty" (Shizuku), and gets depressed whenever Shizuku turns down her interactions with her. She develops a crush on Mitchan because he often comforts her. She recalls that in her second year in middle school, she had turned down the boys' confessions 42 times in 5 days and was thus hated by her female classmates for stealing their crushes. She feels safe around Haru because he has Shizuku, and around Sasayan because he doesn't fawn over her like the other boys. After Mitchan turns down her initial confession, Asako vows to keep trying to win his heart, until Mitchan turns her down for good. She later spends more time talking with Sasayan but is bothered by his candid observations of her behavior and when he later mentions that he has grown to like her too.

 (drama CD), Ryōta Ōsaka (anime)
Played by: Gaku Sano
 Shizuku and Haru's classmate is a popular boy in the baseball club who goes by the nickname . He cares about Haru, and does not want a repeat of what happened in middle school where Haru stopped coming to school. He can be especially blunt when it comes to his friends, such as giving Asako truthful but harsh advice about falling in love with Mitchan, and opening Haru's eyes about Shizuku's true feelings. He later tells Asako that he likes her. He had been interested in Asako since their first year in high school as he got to know her.

 (drama CD), Yūichi Nakamura (anime)
Played by: Yuki Furukawa
Haru's older brother, whom Haru seems to dislike and tries to avoid. At first, he tells Shizuku that he has come to take Haru home upon their father's request, but after seeing that Haru attends school because of Shizuku, he agrees to let him stay. Although he is popular with the ladies, he is a bit terrified when they make advances on him. Haru and Yamaken often flee from him when they see him in the area. Yuzan and Haru's mother had divorced from the family when they were young and later, she abandoned her children. Yuzan and Haru were pulled back to their father's family when Yuzan was around seven years old. Unlike Haru, he decided to adapt to the Yoshida society lifestyle. Throughout the series he tries to interact with Shizuku, and give his advice about relationships. In he final volume's bonus story, he goes on a date with Iyo.

 (drama CD), Kana Hanazawa (anime)
Played by: Minami Hamabe
Chizuru is a glasses-wearing representative for the neighboring class 1-A. She was helped by Haru after he beat up an upperclassman who was bullying her. She is very shy, a little pessimistic and anxious. Even though she has a crush on Haru, she usually finds herself putting aside her own feelings to give him advice towards his relationship with Shizuku. Before starting high school, she was out for a week, and was unable to make friends when she came back, but many of the boys find her cute. She eventually confesses properly to Haru and is formally turned down. She and Haru are put in the same class for their second year of high school. In the final volume, she works as a student teacher, and is courted by Shizuku's little brother Takaya who has fallen in love with her.

Shizuku's father is usually the one who is taking care of Shizuku and her brother Takaya ever since he separated from his wife. He runs a shop but it has gone bankrupt six times that his wife has had to work extra in order to bail him out. He later gets a part-time job with another shop.

Shizuku's mother lives apart from her family because of her work as the breadwinner of the family. Shizuku looks up to her as how she wants to be growing up, and would often give status reports of her academic progress in her talks with her. When Shizuku tells her that she likes a boy but doesn't know what to do about that and school, she encourages Shizuku to double her effort so she can do both. She also appears briefly at Yuzan's birthday party where she had fended off a pass from a congressman.

 (drama CD), Sayuri Yahagi (anime)
She is Chizuru's friend from middle school and helps Chizuru get closer to Haru. She is a petite girl (Yamaken's friends nickname her "Tiny") with a bob cut who attends Otowa Girls High. She had met her boyfriend Tokita in middle school when she was 15, and accepted his confession the day he was moving outside the area. They play online games like Monster Hunter together every day. They vow to go to the same college.

Shizuku's little brother who has the same serious disposition and is mostly quiet. His hobby is collecting pictures on the Internet. Shizuku would often let him go play with friends so he could be social. He also shares his love for sweets with Yuzan. He grows up to be fairly tall in high school. He falls in love with Chizuru in middle school and high school when she was working as a student teacher. Although he stops briefly when Chizuru mentioned she had a boyfriend, he later confesses his love for her and claims he will not give up.

 Ando
 The young Yoshida family butler who looks after Yuzan and starts following Haru and being involved in his life after the latter had visited the family prior to the start of Haru's second year. He tries to pick up girls for Ando and sometimes for himself. At Yuzan's birthday party, he tries to eat as much as he can.

 (drama CD)
 Kenji's younger sister. She is a first-year student who attends Shizuku and Haru's school when the main group is starting their second year. She is tall, has short blond hair, and is fairly reserved. She is aware of her good looks and uses it to prove a point sometimes. She falls in love with Haru, immediately thinking of him as "cool" upon first meeting. Iyo refers to herself in third person. Robico's early notes describe Iyo as "an annoyingly cocky but shy girl who desperately wants attention." She also develops a crush on Yuzan, whom she calls her Moebius. In the bonus chapter at the end of the series, she goes on a date with Yuzan, but her brother drags her away and yells at her for her "terrible taste in men". However, she wishes for her and her brother to find love with someone who would not reject them.

Media

Manga
The manga series is written and illustrated by Robico and published in the Kodansha magazine Dessert. It was serialized between the September 2008 issue, published on August 23, 2008, and the August 2013 issue, published on June 24, 2013. The series has also been released in 12 tankōbon volumes between January 13, 2009, and August 12, 2013. A limited edition version of the final volume was bundled with an OVA episode of the anime series on DVD. The series has been licensed in North America by Kodansha USA, who released the first volume on March 11, 2014. A spin-off manga series was published in Dessert between August 24 and November 22, 2013. Its chapters were collected in a 13th volume, released on January 10, 2014.

Volumes

Anime

An anime adaptation was announced in the July 2012 issue of Kodansha's Dessert magazine. The series was produced by Brain's Base under the direction of Hiro Kaburaki with Noboru Takagi as script supervisor. It aired between October 1 and December 24, 2012. An OVA episode was released on DVD with the final manga volume on August 12, 2013. NIS America licensed the anime for release in North America. Sentai Filmworks licensed the series for streaming in April 2021.

Live-action film
A live-action film adaptation was announced on May 15, 2017, and was released in April 2018. It stars Masaki Suda as Haru and Tao Tsuchiya as Shizuku.

Works cited
 "Ch." is shortened form for chapter and refers to a chapter number of the My Little Monster manga
 "Ep." is shortened form for episode and refers to an episode number of the My Little Monster anime

Reception
The manga has over 6.1 million copies in print.

References

External links
 

2008 manga
2012 anime television series debuts
Romantic comedy anime and manga
School life in anime and manga
Brain's Base
Kodansha manga
Shōjo manga
TV Tokyo original programming
Japanese romantic comedy films